Paulo Ricardo Souza de Melo (born March 1, 1997) is a Brazilian taekwondo athlete who won a bronze medal at the 2019 World Taekwondo Championships on the men's 54 kg.

References 

Living people
1997 births
Brazilian male taekwondo practitioners
World Taekwondo Championships medalists
Taekwondo practitioners at the 2019 Pan American Games
Pan American Games medalists in taekwondo
Pan American Games bronze medalists for Brazil
Pan American Taekwondo Championships medalists
Medalists at the 2019 Pan American Games
21st-century Brazilian people